Felgueiras is a town and a municipality in Portugal. It may also refer to the following places in Portugal:

 Felgueiras (Fafe), a civil parish in the municipality of Fafe
 Felgueiras (Resende), a civil parish in the municipality of Resende
 Felgueiras (Torre de Moncorvo), a civil parish in the municipality of Torre de Moncorvo